Hermas is a genus of flowering plant in the family Apiaceae, native to Cape Provinces of South Africa.

Taxonomy
The genus was first described by Carl Linnaeus in 1771. A 2021 molecular phylogenetic study found that it did not belong to any of the four subfamilies of the Apiaceae, and suggested that it could be placed in a subfamily of its own.

Species
, Plants of the World Online accepted the following species:
Hermas capitata L.f.
Hermas ciliata L.f.
Hermas gigantea L.f.
Hermas intermedia C.Norman
Hermas lanata (Hill) Magee
Hermas proterantha B.J.de Villiers
Hermas quercifolia Eckl. & Zeyh.
Hermas quinquedentata L.f.
Hermas villosa (L.) Thunb.

References

Apioideae
Apioideae genera